The 45th Air and Air Defense Army is an army of the Russian Air Force, part of the Northern Fleet Joint Strategic Command.  It is the successor to the naval aviation of the Northern Fleet.

History
The 45th Army of the Air Force and Air Defense of the Northern Fleet (military unit 06351) was formed in December 2015 on the basis of an order of the President of the Russian Federation in order to strengthen the air situation control system in the Arctic zone.

The carrier aviation of the 45th Army of the Air Force and Air Defense took part in the Russian military operation in Syria . From November to December 2016, from the heavy aircraft-carrying cruiser " Admiral of the Fleet of the Soviet Union Kuznetsov ", the pilots performed 420 sorties, 750 sorties to perform the tasks of search and rescue and aviation support. More than 1000 terrorist facilities were destroyed.

The headquarters is located in Severomorsk . The army is part of the joint strategic command "Northern Fleet".

In 2018, the Northern Fleet resumed air patrols in the Arctic In February 2019, it became known that the Russian Ministry of Defense plans to significantly increase the combat power of the Northern Fleet and deploy two squadrons of MiG-31 fighter-interceptors in the Murmansk region.

Subordinate Units
The command reportedly consists of:

 Headquarters, military unit 06351 (township Safonovo, Severomorsk, Murmansk region);
 1st Air Defense Division, military unit 03123 (Severomorsk);
 583rd Anti-Aircraft Missile Regiment, military unit 36226
 1528th Anti-Aircraft Missile Regiment, military unit 92485
 531st Guards Anti-Aircraft Missile Regiment, military unit 70148
 331st Radio Technical Regiment, military unit 36138
 332nd Radio Technical Regiment, military unit 21514
 3rd Air Defense Division (arch. Novaya Zemlya, Tiksi, Dikson );
 33rd Anti-Aircraft Missile Regiment, military unit 23662
 414th Guards Anti-Aircraft Missile Regiment
 98th Separate Guards Mixed Aviation Vislensky Red Banner, military unit 75385 (Monchegorsk airfield ): Su-24M, Su-24MR 
 174th Guards Fighter Aviation Pechenga Red Banner Regiment, (Monchegorsk airfield ) (MiG-31BM), commissioned in 2019.
 403rd Separate Mixed Aviation Regiment, military unit 49324 (Severomorsk, Severomorsk-1 airfield, Murmansk region): Il-38, Il-20RT, Il-22M, An-12, An-26, Tu-134
 100th Separate Shipborne Fighter Aviation Regiment, military unit 61287 (Severomorsk, Severomrosk-3 airfield, Murmansk region): MiG-29K, MiG-29KUB.
 279th Separate Shipborne Fighter Aviation Smolensk Red Banner Regiment, military unit 98613 (Severomorsk, Severomorsk-3 airfield, Murmansk region): Su-33, Su-30SM, Su- 25UTG
 830th Separate Shipborne Anti-submarine Helicopter Regiment, military unit 87268 (Severomorsk, Severomorsk-1 airfield, Murmansk region): Ka-27, Ka-29, Ka-31 
 2nd Guards Aviation Group, military unit 49324-2 (Kipelovo airfield);
 3rd Guards Aviation Group, military unit 49324-3 (Ostafyevo airfield);
 73rd long-range anti-submarine Aviation Squadron, military unit 39163 (Fedotovo, Kipelovo airfield, Vologda region): Tu-142MR, Tu-142MK 
 N-th UAV regiment (Severomorsk, Severomorsk-1 airfield, Murmansk region)
 89th separate aviation link (Arkhangelsk, Talagi Airport): 2 units. An-26, 2 units. Mi-8MTV-5
 Aviation commandant's office (Arkhangelsk region, Mirny, Plesetsk airfield)
 Aviation commandant's office (Arkhangelsk region, Novaya Zemlya archipelago, Rogachevo village, Amderma-2 airfield).
 Aviation commandant's office (Franz Josef Land archipelago, Alexandra Land island, Nagurskoe airfield).
 Aviation commandant's office (Severnaya Zemlya archipelago, Sredniy island, Sredniy airfield).
 Aviation commandant's office (the archipelago of the Novosibirsk Islands, Kotelny Island, Temp airfield).

Commanders
 Lieutenant General Aleksandr Otroshchenko (since 2015)

See also
 List of military airbases in Russia

References

Air armies of the Russian Air Forces
Units and formations of the Russian Air Force from 2014
Military units and formations established in 2015
Murmansk